Raigarh Airport is located near Kondatarai,  south of Raigarh, in Chhattisgarh, India. The air strip is used mainly for small aircraft and choppers.

References 

Defunct airports in India
Airports in Chhattisgarh
Raigarh district
Airports with year of establishment missing